A cable-stayed suspension bridge or CSS bridge merges the designs of cable-stayed bridges and suspension bridges. The suspension bridge's architecture is better at handling the load in the middle of the bridge, while the cable stayed bridge is better suited to handle the load closest to the tower. Combining these two architectural engineering ideas into a hybrid has been done in Istanbul with the Yavuz Sultan Selim Bridge. A bridge over the Krishna River in India has been approved in October 2022 that will be a CSS bridge design.

Yavuz Sultan Selim Bridge
In Turkey the Yavuz Sultan Selim Bridge over the Bosporus Strait opened in August 2016.

See also
List of longest cable-stayed bridge spans
List of longest suspension bridge spans
List of cable-stayed bridges in the United States
List of bridge types
Floating cable-stayed bridge
Floating suspension bridge

References

 
Structural engineering
Building engineering